Pauline Frederick (born Pauline Beatrice Libbey, August 12, 1883 – September 19, 1938) was an American stage and film actress.

Early life
Frederick was born Pauline Beatrice Libbey (later changed to Libby) in Boston in 1883 (some sources state 1884 or 1885), the only child of Richard O. and Loretta C. Libbey. Her father worked as a yardmaster for the Old Colony Railroad before becoming a salesman. Her parents separated when she was a toddler and Frederick was raised primarily by her mother to whom she remained close for the remainder of her life (her parents divorced around 1897). As a girl, she was fascinated with show business, and determined early to place her goals in the direction of the theater. She studied acting, singing and dancing at Miss Blanchard's Finishing School in Boston where she later graduated.

Her father, however, discouraged her ambitions to be an actress and encouraged her to become an elocution teacher. After pursuing a career as an actress, her father disinherited her (he died in 1922). Due to her father's attitude towards her acting career, Pauline adopted the surname "Frederick" as her stage name. She legally changed her name to Pauline Frederick in 1908.

Career

She made her stage debut at the age of 17 as a chorus girl in the farce The Rogers Brothers at Harvard, but was fired shortly thereafter. She won other small roles on the stage before being discovered by illustrator Harrison Fisher who called her "the purest American beauty." With Fisher's help, she landed more substantial stage roles. Nicknamed "The Girl with the Topaz Eyes", Frederick was cast in the lead roles in the touring productions of The Little Gray Lady and The Girl in White in 1906. She briefly retired from acting after her first marriage in 1909, but returned to the stage in January 1913 in Joseph and His Brethren.

A well-known stage star, Frederick was already in her 30s when she made her film debut in 1915 as Donna Roma in The Eternal City. In March 1927, she received some of her better reviews when she appeared in the play Madame X in London. Frederick was able to make a successful transition to "talkies" in 1929, and was cast as Joan Crawford's mother in This Modern Age (1931). Frederick did not like acting in sound films and returned to Broadway in 1932 in When the Bough Breaks. She would continue the remainder of her career appearing in films and also touring in stage productions in the United States, Europe and Australia.

Personal life
Frederick's personal life was beset with marital and financial problems. Despite having reportedly made a million dollars for her work in silent films, Frederick filed for bankruptcy in 1933.

Frederick was married five times. In 1909, she married architect Frank Mills Andrews. Frederick then briefly retired from acting after their daughter Pauline was born in 1910, but returned upon divorcing Andrews in 1913. She married her second husband, playwright Willard Mack, on September 27, 1917. They divorced in August 1920. Her third husband was Dr. Charles A. Rutherford, a physician, whom she married in Santa Ana, California in 1922. Frederick filed for divorce in December 1924. Their divorce was finalized on January 6, 1925.

It was around this time that the then 43-year-old first met the much younger Clark Gable, then a struggling actor, with whom she allegedly had a two-year affair.

Frederick married her fourth husband, millionaire hotel and Interstate News Company owner Hugh Chisholm Leighton (1878-1942) on April 20, 1930 in New York City. Leighton had the marriage annulled in December 1930 claiming that he was Frederick's husband "in name only". 

Frederick's fifth marriage, in January 1934, was to an ailing United States Army colonel, Joseph A. Marmon, commander of the 16th Infantry Regiment. They remained married until Marmon's death on December 4, 1934.

Death
On January 17, 1936, Frederick underwent emergency surgery on her abdomen. Her health steadily declined, which limited her ability to work. She was dealt a further blow when her mother died in 1937.

On September 16, 1938, Frederick suffered an asthma attack. She suffered a second, fatal asthma attack on September 19, 1938 while she was recuperating at her aunt's home in Beverly Hills. According to her wishes, a private funeral was held on September 23, 1938 in Hollywood, after which she was buried at Grand View Memorial Park Cemetery in Glendale, California.

For her contribution to the motion picture industry, Pauline Frederick has a star on the Hollywood Walk of Fame at 7000 Hollywood Boulevard.

Filmography

References

External links

 
 
 The Pauline Frederick Website
 Photo gallery on silent-movies.org
 Pauline Frederick photo gallery at NYP Library
 Pauline Frederick gettyimages portrait gallery
 Pauline Frederick: Broadway Photographs(Univ of South Carolina)
 Literature on Pauline Frederick
 Pauline Frederick Papers: A Finding Aid (Sophia Smith Collection, Smith College)

1883 births
1938 deaths
20th-century American actresses
Actresses from Boston
American film actresses
American silent film actresses
American stage actresses
Burials in California
Deaths from asthma
Deaths from respiratory failure
Burials at Grand View Memorial Park Cemetery